Mark Kleinschmidt (born 28 May 1974) is a German rower.

Kleinschmidt won bronze at the 1993 World Rowing Championships in Račice with the coxed four. He was a member of the team that won the silver medal in men's eight at the 1996 Summer Olympics in Atlanta. He was born in Oberhausen, North Rhine-Westphalia.

References

1974 births
Living people
German male rowers
Olympic rowers of Germany
Olympic silver medalists for Germany
Olympic medalists in rowing
Medalists at the 1996 Summer Olympics
Rowers at the 1996 Summer Olympics
Sportspeople from Oberhausen
World Rowing Championships medalists for Germany